Ivan Kričak (born 19 July 1996) is a Serbian football defender who plays for Mjällby in the Allsvenskan.

Career

Rad
Kričak was a member of generation which won the Serbian youth league 2015, and promoted in 2015–16 UEFA Youth League. Previously, he was a member of FK Partizan youth school. He made his SuperLiga debut against in the 13th fixture of 2015–16 season, on 14 October 2015.

Career statistics

References

External links
 
 Ivan Kričak stats at utakmica.rs 
 
 

1996 births
Living people
Footballers from Belgrade
Association football defenders
Serbian footballers
FK Rad players
OFK Žarkovo players
FK Sinđelić Beograd players
FK Radnik Surdulica players
Serbian SuperLiga players